Jola-Felupe (Feloup, Felup, Felupe, Floup, Flup, Fulup) or Ejamat (Ediamat) is a Jola language of the Casamance region of Senegal and neighboring Guinea-Bissau, including around Calequisse (Kaləkis), on the western edge of the Manjak area south of the Cacheu River. A person is called ɸuluɸ or ajamuʂay by speakers of the dialect, and the language is called either ɛlɔp eluɸay or ɛlɔp ɛjamuʂay (or Ejamatay in Husuy).

Kerak (Keerak, Keeraku; also Her) appears to be a dialect, though Ethnologue assigns it a separate ISO code due to early survey work which suggested it was more distinct.

References

Languages of Senegal
Languages of Guinea-Bissau
Jola languages